Bahram Siyavashan (Middle Persian: Wahrām Siyāvakhšan) was an Iranian commander, who supported the distinguished Sasanian military leader Bahram Chobin, and played an active role in the early stages of the Sasanian civil war of 589-591, till he was killed by Bahram Chobin himself in 590 after trying to assassinate the latter.

Sources 
 

Generals of Hormizd IV
6th-century births
590 deaths
6th-century Iranian people
Rebellions against the Sasanian Empire